Yelizarovskaya is a station on the Nevsko–Vasileostrovskaya Line of Saint Petersburg Metro, opened on December 21, 1970.

External links

Saint Petersburg Metro stations
Railway stations in Russia opened in 1970
Railway stations located underground in Russia